Floating point is a method for approximating real numbers in computer-based arithmetic

"Floating point" may also refer to:
Floating Point, a jazz music album by John McLaughlin
Floating Points, a British electronic music DJ and producer
Floating Point Systems, an Oregon-based minisupercomputer vendor